The 1935 Fordham Rams football team was an American football team that represented Fordham University as an independent during the 1935 college football season. In its third year under head coach Jim Crowley, Fordham compiled a 6–1–2 record and outscored all opponents by a total of 134 to 41.

Schedule

References

Fordham
Fordham Rams football seasons
Fordham Rams football